Bleu de Bresse is a blue cheese that was first made in the Bresse area of France following World War II. Made from whole milk, it has a firm, edible coating which is characteristically white in color and has an aroma of mushrooms. Its creamy interior,  similar in texture to Brie, contains patches of blue mold.

Production
The curds, inoculated with Penicillium roqueforti, are placed into a perforated mold. After it has formed the desired shape and removed from the mold, the cheese is salted, turned, drained, and covered with pulverized Penicillium camemberti to form the outer coating.

History
Bleu de Bresse originated in 1951 by an agricultural cooperative near Servoz in response to the growing popularity of Italian cheeses. The small packaged rounds were an innovation for the retail market at the time.

See also

 List of French cheeses
 List of cheeses

French cheeses
Blue cheeses